SOARING is a public art work by American artist Lyle London, located in Reiman Plaza at Alverno College on the south side of Milwaukee, Wisconsin.  The abstract stainless steel sculpture rises 20 feet from a fountain. London's commission was coordinated by Uhlein-Wilson Architects.

References

Outdoor sculptures in Milwaukee
2006 sculptures
Steel sculptures in Wisconsin
Stainless steel sculptures in the United States
2006 establishments in Wisconsin
Abstract sculptures in Wisconsin